Huaneng Power International, Inc. (HPI), commonly known as Huaneng Power, is a Chinese electric power company. It was established in 1994 by the China Huaneng Group, one of the five largest power producers in China. It engages in the development, construction and operation of large power plants.

, the market capitalization of its H share was HK$28.484 billion. , about 30.92% of total share capital are "foreign share" (H share plus American depositary share), while the rest were domestic share (A share).

Huaneng Power's H share is a component of Hang Seng China Enterprises Index, representing 50 largest H share companies on the Stock Exchange of Hong Kong. However, under different selection criteria, Huaneng Power's A share is a component of SSE SmallCap Index since May 2018, an index for next 320 shares that were not included in SSE 180 Index.

Huaneng Power was ranked 745th in 2018 Forbes Global 2000.

History
Huaneng Power International (HPI) was established in 1994 by China Huaneng Group, a state-owned enterprise, as a new legal person for the reorganization of Huaneng International Power Development Corporation (HIPDC). In the same year American depositary share of HPI was listed on the New York Stock Exchange. On 21 January 1998 HPI listed its H share on the Stock Exchange of Hong Kong; its A share was listed on the Shanghai Stock Exchange since 6 December 2001. In 2000, HPI also absorbed fellow sister listed company Shandong Huaneng Power Development.

After the dismantle of the State Power Corporation of China in 2003, HPI climbed up one tier as the third-tier subsidiary of the State Council, as China Huaneng Group was directly supervised by the State Council since 2003. The parent company also injected more assets to HPI in order to floats most of the group assets publicly.

In April 2008, HPI also acquired a special-purpose vehicle SinoSing Power from China Huaneng Group for approx. US$985 million. That SPV acquired Tuas Power from Singapore government owned Temasek Holdings for SG$4.235 billion (approx. US$3.1 billion) in March 2008 in a leverage buyout.

Divisions and Subsidiaries

 Jinggangshan Power Plant (100%)
 Luohuang Power Plant
 Hanfeng Power Plant
 Yueyang Power Plant
 Yingkou Power Plant (100%)
 Tuas Power (100%)

Equity investments
Note: only significant entities were listed

current
 China Huaneng Finance (20%)
former
 China Yangtze Power (0.65%; disposed in 2017, had a HPI employee that nominated in CYP's supervisory board)

Shareholders
Huaneng Power International is a government controlled corporation which under the supervision of the State-owned Assets Supervision and Administration Commission of the State Council indirectly.

, ultimate parent company China Huaneng Group (CHNG) owned 10.23% shares of Huaneng Power International directly, plus additional 33.33% via a wholly owned subsidiary Huaneng International Power Development Corporation, another 3.11% shares via another subsidiary, Hong Kong incorporated, China Hua Neng Group Hong Kong and lastly 0.49% shares via mainland incorporated subsidiary, China Huaneng Finance, for a total of 47.16% shares of HPI.

See also

 Huaneng Lancang River Hydropower, sister listed company
 Huaneng Renewables, sister listed company

References

External links
 

Companies formerly in the Hang Seng China Enterprises Index
China Huaneng Group
Energy companies established in 1994
Companies based in Beijing
Companies listed on the Hong Kong Stock Exchange
Companies listed on the Shanghai Stock Exchange
Companies listed on the New York Stock Exchange
Multinational companies headquartered in China
H shares
Chinese companies established in 1994